Septin-4 is a protein that in humans is encoded by the SEPT4 gene.

Function 

This gene is a member of the septin gene family of nucleotide binding proteins, originally described in yeast as cell division cycle regulatory proteins. Septins are highly conserved in yeast, Drosophila, and mouse and appear to regulate cytoskeletal organization. The protein encoded by this gene is thought to be part of a complex involved in cytokinesis. Alternatively spliced variants which encode different protein isoforms have been described; however, not all variants have been fully characterized.

References

Further reading